Parioglossus is a genus of dartfishes native to the Indian and Pacific oceans.

Species
There are currently 21 recognized species in this genus:
 Parioglossus aporos Rennis & Hoese, 1985 (Poreless dartfish)
 Parioglossus caeruleolineatus T. Suzuki, Yonezawa & Sakaue, 2010
 Parioglossus dotui Tomiyama, 1958
 Parioglossus formosus (H. M. Smith, 1931) (Beautiful hover goby)
 Parioglossus galzini J. T. Williams & Lecchini, 2004
 Parioglossus interruptus T. Suzuki & Senou, 1994 (Interrupted dartfish)
 Parioglossus lineatus Rennis & Hoese, 1985 (Lined hover goby)
 Parioglossus marginalis Rennis & Hoese, 1985
 Parioglossus multiradiatus Keith, P. Bosc & Valade, 2004
 Parioglossus neocaledonicus Dingerkus & Séret, 1992
 Parioglossus nudus Rennis & Hoese, 1985 (Naked hover goby)
 Parioglossus palustris (Herre, 1945) (Borneo hoverer)
 Parioglossus philippinus (Herre, 1945) (Philippine dartfish)
 Parioglossus rainfordi McCulloch, 1921 (Rainford's dartfish)
 Parioglossus raoi (Herre, 1939) (Rao's hover goby)
 Parioglossus senoui T. Suzuki, Yonezawa & Sakaue, 2010
 Parioglossus sinensis J. S. Zhong, 1994
 Parioglossus taeniatus Regan, 1912 (Taeniatus dartfish)
 Parioglossus triquetrus Rennis & Hoese, 1985
 Parioglossus verticalis Rennis & Hoese (Vertical hover goby)
 Parioglossus winterbottomi T. Suzuki, Yonezawa & Sakaue, 2010

References

 
Gobiidae
Taxa named by Charles Tate Regan
Marine fish genera